Moira Abernethy-Ford (born 29 May 1939) is a South African former backstroke and freestyle swimmer who competed in the 1956 Summer Olympics.

References

1939 births
Living people
South African female freestyle swimmers
South African female backstroke swimmers
Olympic swimmers of South Africa
Swimmers at the 1956 Summer Olympics
Olympic bronze medalists for South Africa
Olympic bronze medalists in swimming
Medalists at the 1956 Summer Olympics
20th-century South African women
21st-century South African women